There have been a number of North Korean missile tests. North Korea has also fired a number of short-range missiles into the Sea of Japan, in what have been interpreted as political gestures.

, North Korea has carried out 147 tests of strategic missiles since its first such test in 1984. 15 were carried out under the rule of Kim Il-sung and 16 under Kim Jong-il. Under Kim Jong-un, 119 tests have been undertaken as of December, 2019.

Timeline

Number of missiles launched by North Korea per year since 1993 (as of 18 November 2022)

Events related to missile tests

2016

On February 7, 2016, roughly a month after an alleged hydrogen bomb test, North Korea claimed to have put a satellite into low Earth orbit. Japanese Prime Minister Shinzō Abe had warned the North to not launch the rocket, and if it did and the rocket violated Japanese territory, it would be shot down. North Korea launched the rocket anyway, claiming the satellite was purely intended for peaceful, scientific purposes. Several nations, including the United States, Japan, and South Korea, have criticized the launch, and despite North Korean claims that the rocket was for peaceful purposes, it has been heavily criticized as an attempt to perform an ICBM test under the guise of a peaceful satellite launch. China also criticized the launch, however urged "the relevant parties" to "refrain from taking actions that may further escalate tensions on the Korean peninsula".

While some North Korean pronouncements have been treated with skepticism and ridicule, analysts treated the unusual pace of North Korean rocket and nuclear testing in early 2016 quite seriously. Admiral Bill Gortney, head of the North American Aerospace Defense Command, told Congress in March 2016, "It's the prudent decision on my part to assume that [Kim Jong Un] has the capability to miniaturize a nuclear weapon and put it on an ICBM," suggesting a major shift from a few years earlier.

North Korea appeared to launch a missile test from a submarine on April 23, 2016; while the missile only traveled 30 km, one U.S. analyst noted that "North Korea's sub launch capability has gone from a joke to something very serious". North Korea conducted multiple missile tests in 2016.

2017

On August 29, 2017, United Nations Secretary-General António Guterres has condemned the latest North Korea Ballistic Missile Launch and termed it as violation of relevant UN Security Council resolutions, as According to press reports, early Tuesday morning, the North Korea Ballistic Missile travelled some 2,700 kilometers, flying over Japan before crashing into the Pacific Ocean.

On September 3, 2017, North Korea claimed to have successfully tested a thermonuclear bomb, also known as a hydrogen bomb (see 2017 North Korean nuclear test). 
Corresponding seismic activity similar to an earthquake of magnitude 6.3 was reported by the USGS making the blast around 10 times more powerful than previous detonations by the country. Later the bomb yield was estimated to be 250 kilotons, based on further study of the seismic data. The test was reported to be "a perfect success".

2018
Indonesian authorities detained the North Korean's second-largest cargo ship, the Wise Honest, in April for having been photographed loading what appeared to be coal in North Korea. The ship's automatic identification system signal had been turned off since August 2017, trying to conceal its course. In July 2018 the U.S. Justice Department secured a sealed seizure warrant for the ship.

2019
The U.S. seized the Wise Honest in Indonesia under its warrant in May and put it under tow to American Samoa. The Justice Department said it was the first time the United States had seized a North Korean cargo vessel for international sanctions violations. The sanctions are intended "ultimately [to] pressure North Korea to dismantle its nuclear program".

Members of the UN Security Council (UNSC), including UK and France, condemned North Korea's recent missile launches. The nations urged Pyongyang to resume negotiations, citing the missile launches as violation of UNSC resolutions.

On October 2, North Korea confirmed testing a new ballistic missile launched from a submarine, and called it a "significant achievement" towards dealing with external threats and boosting its military power.

In December, Planet Labs released new satellite images of a factory unit where North Korea develops military equipment used in launching long-range missiles, indicating the construction of a new arrangement. The revelation has raised fear that North Korea might launch a rocket or missile to seek concessions in stagnant nuclear negotiations with the U.S.

2020 
The Vice Chairman of the Joint Chiefs of Staff, General John Hyten, said on January 17 that North Korea is building new missiles, capabilities and weapons "As fast as anybody on the planet." He further stated that North Korea is learning from its mistakes while making advances in its missile programs. However, Under Secretary of Defense for Policy John Rood later told the House Armed Forces Committee on January 28 that North Korea did not go through with conducting a major missile launch which had been scheduled to take place sometime between late December and early January.

2021 
North Korea conducted eight missile tests in 2021, compared with four missile tests in 2020.

2022 
A ballistic missile was launched by North Korea on January 5, 2022, off its east coast, as per military officials in Seoul and Japan. The exact munition used for the testing remains unclear. However, the officials did cite the munition as a short-range projectile, which was presumed as a ballistic missile launched from an inland region into the East Coast Sea. Officials claimed to be maintaining "readiness posture" and close monitoring of the situation with its defense allies in the US.

North Korea's 11th missile launch of 2022 was its March 24 launch of an ICBM, marking its first successful ICBM launch since 2017.

According to Japanese Minister of Defense Nobuo Kishi, one or more missiles from North Korea's June 5, 2022 launch had a variable trajectory presumably designed to evade missile defenses.

On October 4, 2022, North Korea launched a missile that flew over and past Japan, prompting Japanese prime minister Fumio Kishida to release an announcement warning citizens to take shelter and other precautionary measures. The missile, likely another ICBM, is said to have landed in the Sea of Japan without incident.

In early October 2022, the U.S. called an emergency UN Security Council meeting, at which it accused Russia and China of protecting the North from stronger sanctions. It also extended its naval drills alongside Japan and South Korea, redeploying the USS Ronald Reagan aircraft carrier.

The same day as the October 14 missile test saw the firing of hundreds of North Korean artillery shells into maritime buffer zones, North Korea's third violation of the buffer zones established by the Pyongyang Joint Declaration of September 2018.

On 2 November 2022, North Korea was reported to have launched 23 missiles of various types. At the same time, more than 100 artillery rounds were fired and again violated the buffer zones established by the 2018 agreement. In response to the missile launches, air raid sirens were activated on Ulleung island, and three AGM-84H/K SLAM-ER missiles were fired by South Korean warplanes.

On 3 November 2022, North Korea reportedly fired at least one ballistic missile off its east coast, including one, believed to be a long-range missile, that flew over and past Japan. The launch triggered the Japanese emergency broadcast system, which alerted residents in the prefectures of Miyagi, Yamagata, and Niigata to stay indoors.

See also 

 Foreign relations of North Korea
 Korean People's Army
 Korean War
 Kwangmyŏngsŏng program — North Korea's satellite launch program and covert testing of ICBM technology 
 North Korea and weapons of mass destruction

References

External links
The CNS North Korea Missile Test Database, by James Martin Center for Nonproliferation Studies
Chronology of U.S.-North Korean Nuclear and Missile Diplomacy, by the Arms Control Association

Military history of North Korea
+
2010s in North Korea
North Korea-related lists
North Korea–South Korea relations